The 2014–15 Elitserien was the eighth season of the present highest Swedish men's bandy top division, Elitserien. The regular season began on 24 October 2014, and the final was played at Tele2 Arena in Stockholm on 14 March 2015.

Summary
At the end of the former season, it looked like the fourteen teams in the league would be the same as last season, because no Allsvenskan team was able to win enough games in the qualification series in March 2014. GAIS was qualified for continued play in Elitserien, but made a decision to withdraw in May 2014. The Swedish Bandy Association first offered the vacancy to Gripen Trollhättan BK based on the competitive results in the last season, but then this club was deemed not to fulfill the economic demands of a club in Elitserien, so instead the Bandy Association decided that Tillberga IK will fill the place.
On 17 September 2014, it was announced that the final will be moved from the Friends Arena to the Tele2 Arena.
On 21 October 2014, it was announced that a third prize game will be introduced from the 2014–15 season.

Teams

League table

Knock-out stage

Final

Relegation play-offs

Group A

Group B

References

Elitserien (bandy) seasons
Bandy
Bandy
Elitserien
Elitserien